Cosmic Chasm is a 1982 vector game originally created by GCE for the Vectrex home game system. It became the first game developed for a home system to be turned into an arcade game after Cinematronics, which was in Chapter 11 bankruptcy at the time, released it as their last color vector game.

Gameplay

The player controls a space ship armed with lasers and shields on a mission to destroy the Cosmic Chasm space station from the inside out. Each room of the space station has protector ships that attack the player directly and a center that slowly expands thus forcing the player not to linger in the room for too long after defeating the protector ships. The player must shoot away force fields that protect the exits in order to traverse the corridors that lead to other rooms. Each exit corresponds to a different direction on the map so choosing the shortest route is key. The goal is to fight your way to the station's reactor room, destroy it and make your way out of the station before being engulfed in the station's destruction. Touching the walls of the rooms is just as fatal as touching a protector ship or the expanding center. The screen has a map portion on top so that the player can keep track of which room of the station he is in as well as plan his escape out of the station. The home game is basically the same in game play but has some noticeable differences from the arcade version.

Vectrex version differences

In the Vectrex version the player controls a drilling vehicle that not only has lasers and shields but a drilling tip that must be used to penetrate and nullify the force-fields that block the exits. The rooms still have the protector ships, expanding center cores and in the one room; a reactor. The Vectrex version also has a map but it is not permanently displayed at the top of the screen like the arcade version. It is a separate screen that appears before each round of play begins or when the player exits a room. As well, in order to destroy the reactor, one must back their vehicle close to the reactor and drop a bomb which will explode after a preset time period, allowing you to make your escape. Finally, since this is a Vectrex game, it only features a monochrome vector display.

References

External links
KLOV entry for Cosmic Chasm
Arcade Flyers page for Cosmic Chasm

1982 video games
Arcade video games
Shoot 'em ups
Vector arcade video games
Cinematronics games
Vectrex games
Video games developed in the United States
Multiplayer and single-player video games